List of law enforcement agencies in Washington may refer to:
 List of law enforcement agencies in Washington (state)
 List of law enforcement agencies in Washington, D.C.